|}

The Cornwallis Stakes is a Group 3 flat horse race in Great Britain open to two-year-old horses. It is run at Newmarket over a distance of 5 furlongs (1,006 metres), and it is scheduled to take place each year in October.

History
The event was established at Ascot in 1946, and it was initially contested over 6 furlongs (1,207 metres). The inaugural running was won by Golden Hackle. It was extended to a mile in 1948, and cut to 5 furlongs (1,006 metres) in 1957. Until 2013 it was run in early October and in 2014 it was transferred to Newmarket to become part of the "Future Champions Day" fixture in mid-October.

The present system of race grading was introduced in 1971, and the Cornwallis Stakes was classed at Group 3 level.

Records

Leading jockey (3 wins):
Joe Mercer – Plainsong (1953), Rosalba (1958), Pushy (1980)
Lester Piggott – Abelia (1957), Favorita (1960), Tin King (1965)
Martin Dwyer – Halmahera (1997), Dominica (2001), Alzerra (2006)
Richard Kingscote - Royal Razalma (2014), Mrs Danvers (2016), Good Vibes (2019)

Leading trainer (3 wins):
Noel Murless – Abelia (1957), Favorita (1960), Splashing (1973)

Winners since 1979

Earlier winners

1946: Golden Hackle
1947: Straight Play
1948: Burnt Brown
1949: Stella Polaris
1950: Par Avion
1951: Sir Phoenix
1952: Prince Canarina
1953: Plainsong
1954: Lark
1955: Roman Conquest
1956: Star Magic 
1957: Abelia
1958: Rosalba
1959: Sing Sing
1960: Favorita 
1961: Prince Tor
1962: Fair Astronomer
1963: Derring-Do 
1964: Spaniard's Mount
1965: Tin King
1966: Green Park
1967: So Blessed
1968: no race
1969: Huntercombe
1970: Cawston's Pride
1971: Deep Diver
1972: The Go-Between
1973: Splashing
1974: Paris Review
1975: Western Jewel
1976: no race
1977: Absalom
1978: Greenland Park

See also
Horse racing in Great Britain
List of British flat horse races

References

Racing Post:

galopp-sieger.de – Cornwallis Stakes.
ifhaonline.org – International Federation of Horseracing Authorities – Cornwallis Stakes (2019).
pedigreequery.com – Cornwallis Stakes – Ascot.

Flat races in Great Britain
Ascot Racecourse
Flat horse races for two-year-olds
Recurring sporting events established in 1946
Newmarket Racecourse
1946 establishments in England